Ignatovskoye is a rural locality (a village) in Yershovskoye Rural Settlement, Sheksninsky District, Vologda Oblast, Russia. The population was 83 as of 2002.

Geography 
Ignatovskoye is located 28 km north of Sheksna (the district's administrative centre) by road. Zaozerye is the nearest rural locality.

References 

Rural localities in Sheksninsky District